Tarpno may refer to the following places in Poland:
Tarpno, Lower Silesian Voivodeship (south-west Poland)
Tarpno, Warmian-Masurian Voivodeship (north Poland)